Canisius Secondary School is one of the earliest centres of learning in Zambia. It is located at Chikuni Mission about 10 km east of Chisekesi town in Monze District in the Southern Province. 

The history of the school starts with the founding of Chikuni Mission in July 1905 by Catholic Church missionary Fr Joseph Moreau S.J, of the Society of Jesus (Jesuits) order of priests and brothers. The school is named after Saint Peter Canisius (Petrus Canisius), the first Dutchman to join the Jesuits. Primary schools were started at Chikuni and surrounding areas from the time the mission was founded, but it was only in August 1949 that the secondary school was opened. 

In 2009, the school celebrated 60 years of education to the people of Zambia. Today, both the local Jesuits and expatriate Jesuits belonging to the Zambia Malawi province continue to minister in this institution. Currently, the student population revolves around 700 students both from around Chikuni area and also from across the nation. 

The core values promoted by the Jesuit education in Zambia and indeed throughout the world is informed by the Ignatian Pedagogical Paradigm (IPP) which focuses on the dignity of an individual. In educating the students, Jesuits also aim at forming the conscience of their students so that in term the students will be able to have preferential option for the poor, underprivileged and those who  live on the margins of society. Furthermore, that they may be able to promote faith that does justice. The Jesuit education fosters to develop a complete human being in all circles of human growth.

See also
 List of Jesuit sites

Schools in Zambia
Private schools in Zambia
Educational institutions established in 1905
Secondary schools in Zambia
1905 establishments in the British Empire
Southern Province, Zambia